Girau do Ponciano is a municipality located in the western of the Brazilian state of Alagoas. Its population is 41,237 (2020) and its area is 502 km².

References

Municipalities in Alagoas